This article details events in the year 1840 in India. Occurrences include the establishment of the Bank of Bombay, and the fall of the Maqpon dynasty.

Incumbents
The Earl of Auckland, Governor-General, 1836–1842.
Alexander Cunningham, aide-de-camp to Lord Auckland, 1836–1840
William Henry Sykes, director at the East India Company, 1840–1867
Sir John Keane, Lieutenant-General of the Bombay Army, 1834–1840
Sir Thomas McMahon, Lieutenant-General of the Bombay Army, 1840–1847
George Russell Clerk, Political Agent at Lahore, 1840
Zirat Prasad, regent of Bhaisunda, 1829–1840
Nau Nihal Singh, Maharaja of the Sikh Empire, 1839–1840
Chand Kaur, Maharaja of the Sikh Empire, 1840–1841
Bhao Rao Phanse, Dewan of Indore State, 1839–1840
Narayan Rao Palshikar, Dewan of Indore State, 1840–October 1841
Raghuji Bohonsle III, Maratha of Nagpur, 1818–1853
Gaya Prasad, Chaube of Taraon State, 1812–1840
Kamta Prasad, Chaube of Taraon State, 1840–1856
Anand Rao Puar "Rao Sahib", Raja of Dewas State, 1817–1840
Haibat Rao Puar, Raja of Dewas State, 1840–12 May 1864
Dariao Singh, Rao of Paldeo, 1812–1840
Nathu Ram, Rao of Paldeo, 1840
Raja Ram, Rao of Paldeo, 1840–October 1842
Sir Claude Martin Wade, first Resident of the Indore Residency, 1840–1844
Pritam Singh, Rana of Kumharsain, 1840–1858
Shiv Saran Singh, Rana of Baghal State, 1828–16 January 1840
Kishan Singh, Rana of Baghal State, 1840–12 March 1875
Jashwant Singh, Raja of Nabha State, December 1783–21 May 1840
Devendra Singh, Raja of Nabha State, 21 May 1840 – 18 September 1846
Kandhaji IV, Thakur Sahib of Palitana State, 1820–1840
Nonghanji IV, Thakur Sahib of Palitana State, 1824–1860

Events
National income - ₹7,560 million
First Anglo-Afghan War, 1837–1842
East India Company initiated the tea trade in Chittagong
Bundelkhand Agency oversees Jalaun's annexation in accordance with the doctrine of lapse
Jaitpur State, founded in 1731, is disestablished
Maqpon falls to Dogra
Jessop & Company completes construction of the first iron bridge in British India, Loha-ka-Pul over River Gomti at Lucknow, 1812–1840
Bank of Bombay is founded on 15 April 1840
Chawri Bazar, a specialized wholesale market of brass, copper, and paper products, is established in North Delhi
Bankura Zilla School is established in West Bengal
Our Lady of Lourdes Church, Tiruchirappalli, is consecrated in Tamil Nadu
Enchey Monastery was established
From 3–4 March 1840, Ayya Vaikundar's followers carry him to Swamithoppe from Thiruvananthapuram in a Vahana after encountering King Swathi Thirunal
Tuvayal Pandarams begins the Tuvayal Thavasu at Vakaippathi as per the instructions of Vaikundar
The first Kodiyettru Thirunal is celebrated in Swamithope pathi in August/September while, according to Ayyavazhi doctrine, Ayya unified the Seven Virgins into himself as per their request
In December, Hari Gopalan Citar awoke following an abnormal dream in which God commissioned him to write the Akilam by giving him the first syllable of The Kappu
4th Cavalry is converted to East India Company service as the 6th Bengal Irregular Cavalry

Law
Lex Loci Report of October 1840 emphasised the importance and necessity of uniformity in the codification of Indian law, relating to crimes, evidences, and contract but it recommended that personal laws of Hindus and Muslims should be kept outside such codification.
Crown Land (Encroachment) Ordinance vested all forests, wastes, unoccupied, and uncultivated lands to the crown
East India Trade Act 1840 is passed in the United Kingdom
Insolvent Debtors, India Act 1840 is passed in the United Kingdom

Births
Zamindar Rohim Boksh Haji, managed the Bhawal Estate
Robert Lang, English amateur cricketer, born 6 April 1840 at Jessore, India
Henry Conwell Wood, born in Bellary, Member of the Queensland Legislative Council

Deaths
Henry Fane, Commander-in-Chief, India, 1835-1839, died on 24 March 1840
Nau Nihal Singh, Maharajah of the Sikh Empire, died on 6 November 1840
Gaya Prasad, Chaube of Taraon State
Jashwant Singh, Raja of Nabha State, died on 21 May 1840
Thug Behram, Thugee serial killer, executed by hanging
Maqpon King Ahmed Shah, killed by Dogra Empire
Haji Shariatullah, founder of the Faraizi movement, died in Dacca

References

 
India
Years of the 19th century in India